Huperzia lucidula, the shining firmoss or shining clubmoss, is a bright evergreen, rhizomatous clubmoss of the genus Huperzia.

They grow in loose tufts 14–20 cm long, occasionally up to 1 m long. The leaves are 7–11 mm long (shorter, 3–6 mm, at annual nodes), narrow, lance-shaped, shiny, and evergreen. The edges are irregularly toothed. The sporangia (spore cases) are nestled in the bases of the upper leaves.

The roots of this plant grow from a creeping, branching, underground rhizome.

The Shining firmoss ranges in Canada from Manitoba to Newfoundland, and south into the United States to Missouri and the Carolinas. Its habitat includes rich, acid soils in cool, moist coniferous and mixed hardwood forests, bog and stream edges, and hillsides. They occasionally grow on cliffs and ledges and on shady, mossy, acidic sandstone.

The specific name lucidula comes from the Latin and means "shining". This is in reference to the plants bright, vivid green color.

Reproduction is either by copious spore production from sporangia at the base of stem leaves or vegetatively through the spread of gemmae

References

Flora of North America - Huperzia lucidula RangeMap:
Huperzia lucidula - Shining Clubmoss

lucidula
Flora of Eastern Canada
Flora of the Northeastern United States
Flora of the Southeastern United States
Flora of Manitoba